Bert Takaaki Kobayashi Sr. (July 8, 1916 – October 6, 2005) was a justice of the Supreme Court of Hawaii from July 17, 1969, to December 29, 1978.

Kobayashi attended President William McKinley High School, graduating in 1935. He attended Gettysburg College in Pennsylvania, and Harvard Law School.

In 1962, Governor John Burns appointed Kobayashi Attorney General of Hawaii, after Kobayashi turned down a previous offer from Burns to run as his lieutenant governor. Burns appointed Kobayashi to the state supreme court in 1969.

References

1916 births
2005 deaths
People from Hawaii
Gettysburg College alumni
Harvard Law School alumni
Hawaii Attorneys General
Justices of the Hawaii Supreme Court
20th-century American judges